Hollywood Chaos is American film that was released in 1989. The film starred Tricia Leigh Fisher and Timothy Williams and was directed by Sean McNamara, marking his directorial debut.

Plot
A farm girl from Iowa moves to Hollywood to pursue her dreams in show business. She joins a major production chorus line, but chaos ensues when all the major actors drop out and are replaced by look-alikes.

References

External links
 

1989 films
1989 independent films
American independent films
Films about Hollywood, Los Angeles
Films directed by Sean McNamara
1989 directorial debut films
Films set in Los Angeles
1980s English-language films
1980s American films